The Billboard Latin Music Lifetime Achievement Award is an honor that is presented by Billboard magazine to an artist or a group "an enduring and exceptional career, encompassing artistic and personal contributions that have had a major impact on Latin music worldwide." From 1993 to 2001, the accolade was presented as "El Premio Billboard" (English: The Billboard Award). The recipient of the Lifetime Achievement Award is decided by the Billboard editorial committee. The Lifetime Achievement Award was first given to Morton Gould, the president of the American Society of Composers, Authors and Publishers (ASCAP), during the 4th Annual Billboard Latin Music Conference in 1993. Gould was given the accolade for his "contribution to the growth of Latin music in the U.S".

From 1994, the Lifetime Achievement Award has been presented during the Billboard Latin Music Awards. The accolade is usually awarded to a recording artist, but may be presented to industry figures who have helped raise the awareness of Spanish-language music globally. Emilio Estefan, Ralph Mercado, and Jorge Pinos, are recipients of the Lifetime Achievement Award who worked in the music industry to promote Latin music. The award was not presented in 2003, 2004, and 2006.

Mexican singer-songwriter Marco Antonio Solís has been given the Lifetime Achievement twice, once in 2005 and again in 2016, to commemorate his 30th and 40th anniversary as a recording artist respectively. Solís, José José, and Armando Manzanero are recipients of the Lifetime Achievement who have also been inducted into the Billboard Latin Music Hall of Fame.

Recipients

See also
 Billboard Latin Music Hall of Fame
 Latin Grammy Lifetime Achievement Award
 Lo Nuestro Excellence Award
 List of lifetime achievement awards

References

1993 establishments in the United States
Awards established in 1993
Billboard Latin Music Awards
Lifetime achievement awards
Music-related lists